Belvedere is a neighborhood of central Casablanca, Morocco. It is in the administrative district of Roches Noires. Belvedere is home to the Casa-Voyageurs Railway Station and the Tachfine Center shopping mall.

References

Neighbourhoods of Casablanca